I'll Take Manhattan is a 1987 American television miniseries,  adapted from Judith Krantz's 1986 bonkbuster novel of the same name. Screened by CBS, it tells the story of the wealthy Amberville family, who run their own publishing company in New York. After Zachary Amberville, the patriarch of the family, dies, the company is taken over by his unscrupulous brother Cutter. Zachary's children, especially his energetic and intelligent daughter Maxi, begin a battle to regain control of their father's company.

I'll Take Manhattan was the highest-rated miniseries of the 1986–87 US television season with a 22.9/35 rating/share.

Plot summary

Part 1
Zachary 'Zach' Amberville (Barry Bostwick), a former fighter pilot and now successful businessman, falls in love with his employee Nina Stern (Jane Kaczmarek). However Nina prefers her career over marriage. Broken hearted, Zach leaves Manhattan for London, where he falls in love with aristocratic ballerina Lily Davina Adamsfield (Francesca Annis). After a failed audition, she agrees to marry Zach, and follows him to New York City. When Nina learns about this, she gets upset. Lily, meanwhile, settles as a housewife and gives birth to Zachary's child. She is worried that her ballet career is now nothing more than a hobby, and acts out by behaving as a spoiled rich wife, even being nicknamed 'The Ice Queen'. Her lack of interest in raising her children comes to notice with Zach, who feels that discipline is not the key factor in parenting. When their eldest son Toby (Tim Daly) is eight years old, he is diagnosed with retinitis pigmentosa, meaning that he will be blind one day.

At a formal party, Zachary runs into his younger brother Cutter (Perry King), who is both charismatic and immature. In the past, he did not contact the family unless he needed money and so Zachary is immediately wary of Cutter's arrival in town. Cutter himself, meanwhile, falls for Lily and they engage in a sexual relationship. Months later, Lily gives birth to Cutter's baby.

Part 2
New York, 1960. Zachary and Lily have grown apart, encouraging Zachary to get back in touch with Nina. Nina is initially reluctant to reconcile with him, though soon falls for his charms and agrees to work for him, on condition that they have a baby. Elsewhere, Cutter has impregnated Lily again and is pushing her to have an abortion. Lily offers to divorce Zachary to be with him, but Cutter leaves her during a trip to San Francisco. In a letter to Lily, he claims to be scouting for a location for a better life, though he actually becomes intimate with a woman named Daphne. Lily feels betrayed and schemes her way back into Zachary's life by claiming to be pregnant with his child. Zachary, who believes her, abandons Nina to start another life with Lily.

In San Francisco, Cutter starts working as a broker and seduces the boss's daughter Candice Alexander (Lynne Griffin), a beautiful but shy woman. Her father Jonas (Walter Gotell) is opposed to the relationship, feeling that Cutter is only interested in Candice because she comes from money, and hires a private detective to gather evidence to prove this. Instead, Cutter assures a prominent part in her life by causing a horse accident that leaves Candice crippled: he marries her afterwards and manipulates Jonas into financially supporting them. Meanwhile, Lily gives birth to a son, whom she names Justin.

Ten years later, Zachary's magazine company grows into an empire, which saddens one of his loyal workers Pavka Meyer (Paul Hecht). His daughter Maxime 'Maxi' (Valerie Bertinelli) is now 17 years old and gets expelled from a strict all-girls school due to her rebellious behavior including skipping school to gamble with her friend India West (Julianne Moore). She starts working as a photographer at her father's company, in the department of Rocco Cipriani (Jack Scalia). She falls in love with him, and they soon have sex.

Cutter resumes his unfaithful behavior, and after an escapade with both Candice's sister Nanette (Kate Vernon) and Alice Chambers, he continues his affair with Lily, which Nanette and colleague Booker witness. Nanette informs her sister about Cutter's cheating behavior, causing Candice to get drunk and confront him. Cutter dismisses her claims, and states that Nanette has lied out of jealousy, before actually visiting Nanette to hit her. Nanette takes revenge by sending Candice pictures of Lily and Cutter having sex. Candice is heartbroken and commits suicide by jumping from her hotel room. The photos are then sent to Zachary, who is now aware of both his wife and brother's betrayal. Instead of leaving his wife, Zachary threatens to take the children and murder Cutter if she ever meets with his brother again.

In another sub-plot, Lily meets with Nina and claims that she did not trick Zachary into reconciling with her, leaving Nina to believe that Zachary did not want to be with her.

Cast
 Valerie Bertinelli as Maxime "Maxi" Amberville-Cipriani
 Alisan Porter as Young Maxime "Maxi" Amberville
 Barry Bostwick as Zach Amberville
 Francesca Annis as Lily Davina-Amberville
 Georgia Slowe as Young Lily Davina
 Jane Kaczmarek as Nina Stern
 Jack Scalia as Rocco Cipriani
 Paul Hecht as Pavka Meyer
 Timothy Daly as Toby Amberville
 Julianne Moore as India West
 Adam Storke as Justin Amberville
 Keram Malicki-Sánchez as Young Justin Amberville
 Perry King as Cutter Amberville
 Ken Olin as Nat Lammerman
 Kate Vernon as Nanette Alexander
 Brett Cullen as Dennis Brady
 Lynne Griffin as Candice Alexander
 Adam LeFevre as "Jumbo" Booker
 Staci Keanan as Angelica Cipriani
 Hillary Wolf as Young Angelica Cipriani
 Barbara Barrie as Sarah Amberville
 Chris Noth as Fred Knox
 Fritz Weaver as Mr. Amberville
 Katharine Houghton as Pepper Delafield
 Donald Trump as Himself

References

External links

1987 American television series debuts
1987 American television series endings
1980s American television miniseries
CBS original programming
Television shows based on American novels
Television shows set in London
Television shows set in New York City
Television shows set in San Francisco
Adaptations of works by Judith Krantz